Minuscule 181 (in the Gregory-Aland numbering), α 101 (Soden), is a Greek minuscule manuscript of the New Testament, on parchment. Palaeographically it has been assigned to the 11th century.

Formerly it was labelled by 40a, 46p, and 12r.
It has marginalia.

Description 

The codex contains the text of the Acts of the Apostles, Catholic epistles, and Pauline epistles with only one lacunae (Titus 3:3 – Philemon), on 169 elegant parchment leaves (size ). The Book of Revelation contained in this codex has been re-numbed Gregory-Aland 2919. The text is written in one column per page, in 26-32 lines per page.

Book of Revelation was added in the 15th century, and has been re-numbered GA-2919.

Text 

The Greek text of the codex is a mixture of text-types in Acts and Catholic epistles. The Text of the Pauline epistles is a representative of the Western text-type. The text of the Apocalypse is a representative of the Byzantine. Aland placed it in Category V. The text of the rest of book Aland placed in Category III.

In Acts 7:18 it reads Εγυπτον for Αιγυπτον.

In Acts 12:25 it reads απο Ιερουσαλημ (from Jerusalem) along with D, Ψ, 436, 614, 2412, ℓ 147, ℓ 809, ℓ 1021, ℓ 1141, ℓ 1364, ℓ 1439, ar, d, gig, vg, Chrysostom; majority reads εις Ιερουσαλημ (to Jerusalem);

In Acts 16:10 it reads θεος along with P74, Sinaiticus, Alexandrinus, Vaticanus, Ephraemi, E, 044, 33, 81, 326, 630, 945, 1739, ar, e, l, vg, copbo, geo; other reading κυριος, is supported by D, P, 049, 056, 0142, 88, 104, 330, 436, 451, 614, 629, 1241, 1505, 1877, 2127, 2412, 2492, 2495, Byz, c, d, gig, syrp,h, copsa.

In Acts 18:26 it reads την οδον του θεου along with P74, א, A, B, 33, 88, 326, 436, 614, 2412, ℓ 60, ℓ 1356.

In Romans 8:1 it reads Ιησου κατα σαρκα περιπατουσιν αλλα κατα πνευμα, for Ιησου. The reading of the manuscript is supported by אc, Dc, K, P, 33, 88, 104, 326, 330, (436 omit μη), 456, 614, 630, 1241, 1877, 1962, 1984, 1985, 2492, 2495, Byz, Lect.

The text of Romans 16:25-27 is following 14:23, as in Codex Angelicus Codex Athous Lavrensis, Uncial 0209 326 330 451 460 614 1241 1877 1881 1984 1985 2492 2495.

In 1 Corinthians 2:1 it reads μαρτυριον along with B D G P Ψ 33 81 104 326 330 451 614 629 630 1241 1739 1877 1881 1962 1984 2127 2492 2495 Byz Lect it vg syrh copsa arm eth. Other manuscripts read μυστηριον or σωτηριον.

In 1 Corinthians 7:5 it reads τη προσευχη (prayer) along with 𝔓11, 𝔓46, א*, A, B, C, D, F, G, P, Ψ, 6, 33, 81, 104, 629, 630, 1739, 1877, 1881, 1962, it vg, cop, arm, eth. Other manuscripts read τη νηστεια και τη προσευχη (fasting and prayer) or τη προσευχη και νηστεια (prayer and fasting).

In 1 Timothy 3:16 it has textual variant  (God manifested) (Sinaiticuse, A2, C2, Dc, K, L, P, Ψ, 81, 104, 326, 330, 436, 451, 614, 629, 630, 1241, 1739, 1877, 1881, 1962, 1984, 1985, 2492, 2495, Byz, Lect), against ὃς ἐφανερώθη (he was manifested) supported by Sinaiticus, Codex Alexandrinus, Ephraemi, Boernerianus, 33, 365, 442, 2127, ℓ 599.

In 2 Timothy 4:19 it has additional reading Λεκτραν την γυναικα αυτου και Σιμαιαν και Ζηνωνα τους υιους αυτου, this reading occurs in several other manuscripts and in Acta Pauli and Tecla.

History 

It is dated by the INTF to the 11th century.

The manuscript was given by Christina of Sweden to Cardinal Dezio Azzolino, and bought from him by Alexander VIII (1689-1691) — like codices 154, 155, 156. The text of the manuscript was examined by Bandini, Birch (about 1782), Scholz, and Burgon. C. R. Gregory saw it in 1886.

Formerly it was labelled by 40a, 46p, and 12r. Gregory in 1908 gave it the number 181.

It is currently housed at the Vatican Library (Reg. gr. 179), at Rome.

See also 
 List of New Testament minuscules
 Biblical manuscript
 Textual criticism

References

Further reading 
 Herman C. Hoskier, Concerning the Text of the Apocalypse 1 (London, 1929), pp. 17–24

External links 
 Minuscule 181 at the Encyclopedia of Textual Criticism

Greek New Testament minuscules
11th-century biblical manuscripts
Manuscripts of the Vatican Library